William A. Sederburg is an American university president and politician. He is a senior scholar at the American Association of State Colleges and Universities. Sederburg was commissioner of the Utah System of Higher Education from 2008 to 2012. He was president of President of Utah Valley State College from 2003–2008, overseeing its transformation into Utah Valley University. Sederburg was president of Ferris State University from 1994 to 2003 and served as a member of the Michigan Senate from 1978 to 1991.

Sederburg was born in Nebraska and raised in Minnesota.  He has a bachelor's degree from Minnesota State University, Mankato and a master's degree and Ph.D., both from Michigan State University, in political science.

Sederburg and his wife Joyce are the parents of two children.

On June 6, 2014, University of North Carolina President Tom Ross announced that Sederburg will become the interim chancellor of the University of North Carolina Wilmington on August 1, 2014.

Sources
Crain's Detroit article on Sederburg

Utah HigherEd bio of Sederburg

Year of birth missing (living people)
Living people
Heads of universities and colleges in the United States
Ferris State University people
Michigan State University alumni
Michigan state senators
Minnesota State University, Mankato alumni
People from Nebraska
Utah Valley University people
20th-century American politicians